Rachel Parish (born 21 May 1981) is an English international sportswoman who won a shooting gold medal and silver medal at the 2006 Commonwealth Games in Melbourne. Before going to university, she went to Wellington College in Berkshire. Already holding a degree in Biochemistry and Genetics from The University of Nottingham from 2002, Parish then read medicine at Southampton University, graduating as a doctor in 2007. Parish is also a keen fencer, and has captained both the Nottingham and Southampton university fencing teams.

Selected for the Commonwealth Games at Melbourne in 2006, she shot in the double trap pairs competition in partnership with Charlotte Kerwood and together they took the gold medal. Rachel also won a silver medal in the double trap individuals.

She also claimed double trap team silver and individual bronze at the 2017 ISSF Grand Prix in Moscow, which was held alongside (but not part of) that year's World Shotgun Championships.

References

External links

Profile for the Melbourne 2006 Commonwealth Games

1981 births
Living people
English female sport shooters
Commonwealth Games gold medallists for England
Commonwealth Games silver medallists for England
Commonwealth Games bronze medallists for England
Commonwealth Games medallists in shooting
Shooters at the 2006 Commonwealth Games
Shooters at the 2014 Commonwealth Games
British female sport shooters
Medallists at the 2006 Commonwealth Games
Medallists at the 2014 Commonwealth Games